Guitar Romantic is the first and only studio album by American rock band The Exploding Hearts, released both by Dirtnap Records and Screaming Apple Records in 2003.

Reception

Pitchfork listed the song "Modern Kicks" at 290 in its list of "The Top 500 Tracks of the 2000s".

Track listing

References

2003 debut albums
The Exploding Hearts albums